The Book of Unknown Americans is a 2014 novel by Cristina Henríquez published by Knopf. The story is told from multiple first-person points of view, with the two main narrators being Alma Rivera, a 30-something housewife from Pátzcuaro, Mexico, and Mayor Toro, a teenage social outcast and first-generation American whose parents were originally from Panama.

Development and publication history
Henríquez originally conceived the novel as a short story told from Mayor's point of view. The 304-page book was published on June 3, 2014 by Knopf.

Plot
Alma and Arturo Rivera leave their comfortable surroundings in Pátzcuaro, Mexico when their daughter Maribel suffers a severe head injury. Their journey into the United States leads them to Newark, Delaware, a town with a school for the intellectually disabled known as Evers. Alma and Arturo hope that enrolling Maribel in Evers will help her recover from her severe brain damage. Arturo obtains a work visa, and he is able to get a job at a mushroom factory. However, the family's life beyond his job remains uncertain; they do not have a stable home environment, Alma does not work, and Maribel has not been officially admitted to Evers.

The Riveras encounter the plight of many poor immigrants. They do not know how to speak English, they are unfamiliar with the school systems, and they are new to American culture.

They find emotional support when they meet Rafael and Celia Toro. The Toro family have two sons, Enrique and Mayor, and they live in the same low-income apartment complex as the Riveras. The Toro parents are immigrants from Panama who have become legal citizens but struggle to get by on one meager income. Celia Toro befriends Alma Rivera, and both women grow quite fond of each other. When Celia's son Mayor meets Maribel he is immediately attracted to her. Yet given her inability to speak fluidly due to her head injury, he learns to communicate with her through other means. But their relationship is threatened by Garrett Miller, a boy at Mayor's school, who constantly bullies Mayor. One day after school, Garrett follows them and he bullies Mayor and accosts Maribel. Days later, Garrett sexually assaults Maribel. Her mother Alma witnesses the assault, and she immediately goes to the police. The police dismiss the incident in part because Alma does not know how to speak English well. Her lack of English speaking skills lead to miscommunication and a misunderstanding of the facts. The police officer characterizes the incident as two teenagers who are most likely infatuated with one another and a mother who is not savvy about these common liaisons among teenagers. Alma is traumatized by the assault, and she is deeply concerned Arturo will blame her for not keeping Maribel safe. Soon after she meets with the police, she decides not to tell Arturo about the entire incident.

Arturo eventually loses his job and he is unable to find a new one. His new unemployment status causes him to lose his visa, and his non-visa status also affects his family's legal standing. They can no longer legally stay in the United States.

Meanwhile, Quisqueya Solis, a prying neighbor who has also been the victim of assault, tells Alma that Mayor and Maribel were alone together kissing in a car. Quisqueya suggests, by pure speculation, that Mayor may have been taking advantage of Maribel. This news triggers Alma's trauma when she witnessed Garrett assaulting her daughter. She confronts Celia and bans Mayor from seeing her daughter.

One day in March, after the first snowfall of the year, Mayor steals his father's new used car. He drives to Maribel's school and he helps her leave school grounds on false pretenses. They take a drive to the beach. When Maribel does not come home from school, Alma thinks Garrett may have kidnapped her and sexually assaulted her again. This concern leads her to tell her husband the truth about the Garrett Miller assault.

Arturo is infuriated when he hears the news and decides to go to Garrett's house. When he arrives at Garrett's house he encounters Garrett's father, who is also enraged, and who points a gun at Arturo and then pulls the trigger. When Mayor and Maribel return home they learn that Arturo has been shot by Garrett's father. He dies at the hospital, and Alma decides to return home to Mexico shortly after. As a final gesture of friendship, Celia and her other neighbors donate money that Alma needs to transport Arturo's body back to Mexico.

Characters

Main characters
 Alma Rivera - The novel is told mainly through the perspective of Alma, the Rivera family matriarch. Nearly every third chapter is one in which Alma narrates her plight. She is the wife of Arturo Rivera and the mother of Maribel. She holds herself responsible for her daughter's head injury and is plagued by guilt.

Arturo Rivera - Husband of Alma Rivera. He is a loving husband and father to their daughter Maribel, and he wants to help his daughter recover from her head injury. He moves to the United States primarily so that Maribel can attend the Evers School in Delaware. His previous life in Patzcuaro Mexico was stable and comfortable with a well-paying job. Upon arriving to the United States, he is able to obtain a work visa, and he finds a job working for a mushroom factory for less than minimum wage. This job involves long hours without any breaks. Despite his hardships, he has a good disposition and he takes great pride in his family. He is shot and killed after confronting Garrett's father.

Maribel Rivera - Daughter of Alma and Arturo. In Mexico, she fell from a ladder where her dad was working after her mom failed to hold it steady. Her accident has left with her with brain damage, which includes an inability to speak fluidly and fluently in any language.

Mayor Toro - Mayor narrates a substantial portion of the story, revealing his family's economic disadvantage. He is a young teenage boy, the son of Panamanian immigrants Cecilia and Rafael, and he is in love with Maribel Rivera. He finds a kinship with her in their shared experience as poor first-generation immigrants trying to assimilate in American culture. They also share similar character traits, as quiet, sensitive and well-intentioned teenagers.

Celia Toro - Wife of Rafael Toro, with whom she has two sons, Enrique and Mayor. She is acutely aware of her family's dire financial situation, and she offers to help by finding employment. But Rafael refuses to let her work because he thinks she needs to focus on child care and household duties. Although she finds his refusal to let her work frustrating, she obeys her husband. She also befriends Alma Rivera, and they become close confidants. She misses Panama and wishes to go back and visit.

Rafael Toro - Husband of Celia and subscribes to traditional gender roles. He firmly believes a women's place is in the home and men should financially provide for their family. He also exhibits an inability to express emotion and harsh attitude towards his son Mayor's sensitivity. He is particularly upset with the Mayor's lack of interest in soccer, and he constantly compares Mayor to his older brother Enrique, who attends university on a soccer scholarship.

Garrett Miller - A high school peer of Mayor known for bullying Mayor and Maribel. He sexually assaults Maribel.

Quisqueya Solis - A notorious interloper who meddles in Mayor and Maribel's relationship.

Benny Quinto - A young man who leaves the priesthood to eventually make money through undesirable means.

Gustavo Milhojas - Half Mexican and half Guatemalan, Gustavo's mixed background shamed him into emigrating from Mexico. He settles in the apartment complex and supports his family from abroad.

Adolfo "Fito" Angelino - The apartment complex landlord.

Nelia Zafon - A former dancer of Puerto Rican decent who currently owns the local theater in town.

Jose Mercado - A local resident of the apartment complex who enjoys the creative arts.

Micho Alvarez - A Mexican man who also lives in the apartment complex. He is a political activist who uses photojournalism to document social injustices in his neighborhood.

Minor characters
Enrique Toro - Mayor's older brother. He attends university on a soccer scholarship.

Ynez Mercado - A Puerto Rican woman who befriends Alma.

Phyllis - A staff member at Evers. She assists Alma with various translations regarding Maribel's school work.

Mrs. Shields - Alma's English teacher.

William - Mayor's closest friend in high school.

Reception
The book received predominantly favorable reviews. In the Los Angeles Review of Books, Daniel Olivas said the book "is as disturbing as it is beautiful, a testament to the mixed blessings our country offers immigrants, who struggle against bigotry and economic hardship while maintaining just enough hope to keep striving for something better...a narrative mosaic that moves toward a heartrending conclusion." In Bustle, Claire Luchette described The Book of Unknown Americans as a "powerful novel...about love: familial love, two kids' first love, love of friends, neighbor, and country." In The Guardian, Sandra Newman felt the "strength of the book is in the quiet details", but criticized Henríquez for spending "too much time on the periphery of her story, making points that feel at once too vague and too obvious." Reviewing the novel in The New York Times, Ana Castillo found the novel "unfailingly well written and entertaining, [but] more often than not the first-person accounts don't seem quite authentic."

The novel was chosen as one of The Best Books of 2014 by Amazon.com. The Daily Beast named it the 2014 novel of the year.

References

Hispanic and Latino American novels
Literature by Hispanic and Latino American women
Novels set in Delaware
Panamanian-American culture
2014 American novels
Alfred A. Knopf books